The Giorgio de Chirico Art Centre is an art centre/museum in a three-story building in  Volos, Magnesia, Greece.  It is named for internationally famous Italian artist Giorgio de Chirico, who was born to Italian parents in Volos on July 10, 1888.  

The first floor of the museum is a municipal museum with more than 400 works.  The second and third floors house the Alekos K. Damtsas Museum which holds a collection donated by Alexandros K. Damtsas, a local businessman. It consists of more than 500 paintings by Greek artists of the 19th and early 20th century, and engravings, maps, and documents about Volos, and artworks by locals. According to a Pelion-region travel website, it is one of 20 "sites worth seeing" in the region.

References

External links
Artistic Organisation, Municipality of Volos Official website
Page on the website of the Municipality of Volos (Greek)
Page on the Museum on WonderGreece
Page on the Art Centre on InfoPelion

Museums in Volos
Art museums and galleries in Greece